The World's Greatest Jazz Band was an all-star jazz ensemble active from 1968 to 1978.

Dick Gibson founded the group at his sixth Jazz Party, an annual event. The group performed mostly Dixieland jazz and recorded extensively. It was co-led by Yank Lawson and Bob Haggart, and did early jazz standards alongside contemporaneous pop songs done in a Dixieland style. Though the group disbanded in 1978, the name was revived several times by Lawson and Haggart for limited engagements.

Members

 Billy Butterfield
 Cutty Cutshall
 Vic Dickenson
 Morey Feld
 Carl Fontana
 Bud Freeman
 Dick Gibson
 Bob Haggart
 Scott Hamilton
 Clancy Hayes
 Eddie Hubble
 Peanuts Hucko
 Keith Ingham
 Gus Johnson
 Roger Kellaway
 Al Klink
 Yank Lawson
 Cliff Leeman
 George Masso
 Lou McGarity
 Johnny Mince
 Bob Miller
 Eddie Miller
 Joe Muranyi
 Chuck Riggs
 Bobby Rosengarden
 Sonny Russo
 Carrie Smith
 Maxine Sullivan
 Ralph Sutton
 Dick Wellstood
 Bob Wilber
 Roy Williams

Discography
 Extra! (Project 3 Total Sound, 1969)
 The World's Greatest Jazzband of Yank Lawson and Bob Haggart (Project 3 Total Sound, 1969)
 Live at the Roosevelt Grill (Atlantic, 1970)
 The World's Greatest Jazzband (Atlantic, 1971)
 What's New? (Atlantic, 1971)
 Hark the Herald Angels Swing (World Jazz, 1972)
 In Concert: Vol. 1 Massey Hall (World Jazz, 1973)
 Good News with Teresa Brewer (Signature, 1973)
 Plays Cole Porter (World Jazz, 1975)
 Plays Rodgers & Hart (World Jazz, 1976)
 Plays Duke Ellington (World Jazz, 1976)
 In Concert (Recorded Live at the Lawrenceville School) (Flying Dutchman, 1976)
 On Tour (World Jazz, 1976)
 On Tour Vol. 1 and 2 (World Jazz, 1977)
 Plays George Gershwin (World Jazz, 1977)
 On Tour II with Maxine Sullivan (World Jazz, 1977)

References

American jazz ensembles
Atlantic Records artists
Dixieland revival ensembles
Musical groups established in 1968
Musical groups disestablished in 1978